Maciej Iwański (born 7 May 1981) is a Polish former football midfielder.

Career

Club
After Zagłębie Lubin's relegation for corruption, many of the top teams in the first division fought for Iwański's signature. Legia Warsaw finally completed a move in the summer 2008, and Iwański became the most expensive transfer between two Polish clubs. He finished his career in 2018 at Unia Oświęcim.

International
A former U21 international, Iwański debuted in the senior side on 6 December 2006 in a friendly game versus UAE in Abu Zabi. On February 3, 2007 he scored his first international goal, versus Estonia.

References

External links
 
 
 

1981 births
Living people
Polish footballers
Zagłębie Lubin players
Legia Warsaw players
Manisaspor footballers
ŁKS Łódź players
Podbeskidzie Bielsko-Biała players
Ruch Chorzów players
Poland international footballers
Poland under-21 international footballers
Ekstraklasa players
Süper Lig players
Polish expatriate footballers
Expatriate footballers in Turkey
Footballers from Kraków
Association football midfielders